John Maxwell Evans (born August 4, 1942) is a former judge of the Canadian Federal Court of Appeal.

In 2013, Evans was listed as a NAFTA adjudicator.

References

1942 births
Living people
Judges of the Federal Court of Appeal (Canada)